The German Evangelical Alliance is a national evangelical alliance, member of the World Evangelical Alliance.

History
The German Evangelical Alliance (German: Deutsche Evangelische Allianz) has been active since 1851 in Germany. 

At present the German EA has members who are closely connected. They are connected to the EA-Organisation or welfare services, who are a part of the "Evangelische Allianz".

Before 1990 in Germany there were two separate organisations, since the division of the country.  In the GDR there was the "Evangelische Allianz in der DDR" and the "Deutsche Evangelische Allianz e. V." in the West, based in Stuttgart.

In the course of reunification of Germany both organisations also merged. The offices of the "Deutschen Evangelische Allianz" were until November 2004 in Stuttgart. Being pushed for money, the Organisation moved to Bad Blankenburg.

Today the German EA is a state-approved organisation (eingetragener Verein or e.V.), with a conference center, recreation home and hotel.

There are 1,200 local churches, free churches or free groups who support the alliance.

Deputies of the Evangelische Allianz meet once a year in Bad Blankenburg for the Alliance-Conference (German: Allianzkonferenz).

The affiliated “Institute for the Islamic Question” (German: Institut für Islamfragen) gives a special service of information about Islam from a Christian point of view.

The "Deutsche Evangelische Allianz" is an accredited organisation by German law and is represented in the Bundestag (German parliament) by Wolfgang Baake as Commissioner of the German EA.

Literature 
 .
 .

Publications of Evangelische Allianz 
 Magazine EiNS - Gemeinsam Glauben, Miteinander Handeln, frequency 4x a year
 Giveaway to special themes, per example Islam
 Statements to ethic and political question of principle
 Newsletters

See also 
Evangelical Alliance

References

External links 
 German Evangelical Alliance, German: Deutsche Evangelische Allianz
 Swiss Evangelical Alliance, German: Schweizerische Evangelische Allianz
 World Evangelical Alliance 
 European Evangelical Alliance
 Hope for Europe, also from European Evangelical Alliance
 News Service of German Evangelical Alliance “idea” - news in German

Evangelical organizations established in the 19th century
Evangelicalism in Germany
1846 establishments in Germany
National evangelical alliances